The Bristol Combination Cyril Parsons Bowl is an annual rugby union knock-out club competition organised by the Bristol and District Rugby Football Combination – one of the five bodies that make up the Gloucestershire Rugby Football Union.  It was first introduced during the 2012–13 season, with the inaugural winners being Winscombe, and is the third most important competition organised by the Bristol Combination, behind the Bristol Combination Cup and Bristol Combination Vase.  

The Bristol Combination Vase is currently open for clubs sides based in Bristol and the surrounding countryside (including parts of Gloucestershire and Somerset), typically based in tier 9 (Gloucester 1/Somerset 1), tier 10 (Gloucester 2) and tier 11 (Gloucester 3).  The format is a cup knockout with a first round, quarter-finals, semi-finals and a final held at a neutral venue between April–May.

Bristol Combination Cyril Parsons Bowl winners

Number of wins
Bristol Barbarians (2)
Chipping Sodbury (1)
Old Colstonians (1)
St Mary's Old Boys (1)
Winscombe (1)

Notes

See also
 Gloucestershire RFU
 Bristol and District Rugby Football Combination
 Bristol Combination Cup
 Bristol Combination Vase
 English rugby union system
 Rugby union in England

References

External links
 Gloucestershire RFU
 Bristol & District Rugby Football Combination

Recurring sporting events established in 2012
2012 establishments in England
Rugby union cup competitions in England
Rugby union in Bristol
Rugby union in Gloucestershire
Rugby union in Somerset